Ranuj Junction railway station is a railway station in Patan district, Gujarat, India on the Western line of the Western railway network. Passenger and DEMU trains halt here.

References 

Railway stations in Patan district
Ahmedabad railway division
Railway junction stations in Gujarat